Kiang Malingue is a commercial art gallery with premises in Hong Kong and Shanghai, China. It was founded by Edouard Malingue and Lorraine Kiang Malingue as the Edouard Malingue Gallery in 2010. The establishment combines different disciplines, ranging from video and installation to painting and sound, and also actively works with international institutions and curators to present off-site artistic projects and exhibitions.

Background
Since 2010, as Edouard Malingue Gallery, the institution has produced over 100 exhibitions in Hong Kong, Shanghai, Beijing, and internationally. Notable solo exhibitions in recent years include Chou Yu-Cheng's "Sedimentary Gradient" in 2022, Yeung Hok Tak's "What a big smoke ring" in 2022, Nabuqi's "Ghost, Skin, Dwelling" in 2021, Yang Chi-Chuan's "Plastonki" in 2021, Yu Ji's "Forager" in 2020, Günther Förg's "1986 – 1992" in 2020, Ko Sin Tung's "Adaption" in 2019, "R for Rhombicuboctahedron" in 2019, the eighth volume of Ho Tzu Nyen's series "The Critical Dictionary of Southeast Asia", "The highway is like a lion's mouth" by Samson Young in 2018, Wong Ping's "Who's the Daddy" in 2017, "Refresh, Sacrifice, New Hygiene, Infection, Clean, Robot, Air, Housekeeping, www.ayibang.com, Cigarette, Dyson, Modern People" by Chou Yu-Cheng in 2017, among others.

Notable international projects include Yuan Yuan's exhibition "Alternative Realities" in the Palazzo Terzi, Bergamo in 2018, Su-Mei Tse's "A Certain Frame Work 3 (Villa Farnesina)" for Hayward Gallery's Waterloo Billboard Commission in 2018, and the moving image project "Dreams, Illusions, Phantom Flowers" in partnership with Elephant West, London in 2019.

Kiang Malingue has participated in art fairs, including Art Basel, Art Basel Hong Kong, Art Basel Miami Beach, Frieze London, Frieze Seoul, and West Bund Art & Design. In 2018, it was involved in the organisation of the first edition of Condo Shanghai. It also organises public talks.

Artists
The gallery represents a variety of established and emerging international artists, including:

 Brook Hsu
 Cho Yong-ik
 Chou Yu-cheng
 Cui Xinming
 He Yida
 Ho Tzu Nyen
 Ko Sin Tung

 Kwan Sheung Chi
 Lai Chih-Sheng
 Nabuqi
 Samson Young
 Tao Hui
 Tromarama
 Wang Wei

 Wang Zhibo
 Wong Ping
 Yang Chi-Chuan
 Yu Ji
 Yuan Yuan
 Zheng Bo
 Zheng Zhou

Space
The gallery's first space opened in 2010 and was designed by the Office for Metropolitan Architecture Asia (Hong Kong), led by the architect Rem Koolhaas. In January 2015, the gallery expanded twice in size and moved to a new space, occupying an entire floor, designed by the Hong Kong-based firm BEAU Architects.

References

External links
 

Art museums and galleries in Hong Kong
Art galleries established in 2010
Contemporary art galleries in China
2010 establishments in Hong Kong